Metavivianite is a hydrated iron phosphate mineral found in a number of geological environments. As a secondary mineral it is typically formed from oxidizing vivianite. Metavivianite is typically found as dark blue or dark green prismatic to flattened crystals.

It was named by C. Ritz, Eric J. Essene, and Donald R. Peacor in 1974 for its structural relationship to vivianite.

See also
List of minerals

References

Phosphate minerals
Hydrates
Iron(III) minerals
Triclinic minerals
Minerals in space group 1